Janne Hannula (born 3 January 1982) was a Finnish footballer who played for JJK.

References
Guardian Football

1982 births
Living people
Finnish footballers
JJK Jyväskylä players
Veikkausliiga players
Place of birth missing (living people)
Association football defenders